Kelaniyage Jayantha Silva (born February 6, 1973, Kalutara) is a former Sri Lankan cricketer who played in 7 Tests and one ODI from 1995 to 1998.

1973 births
Living people
Basnahira South cricketers
Sri Lanka Test cricketers
Sri Lanka One Day International cricketers
Sri Lankan cricketers
Sinhalese Sports Club cricketers